The Great Northern Warehouse is the former railway goods warehouse of the Great Northern Railway in Manchester city centre, England, which was refurbished into a leisure complex in 1999. It was granted Grade II* listed building status in 1974.

All four sides have friezes lettered in white brick reading "Great Northern Railway Company's Goods Warehouse". It was built above the Manchester and Salford Junction Canal, and a dock was constructed beneath to allow goods to be transferred to and from canal barges via shafts and a complex system of haulage using hydraulic power. 

The building could hold a total of 150 goods wagons across two of its levels, with capacity for a further 500 in its sidings. Its construction effectively wiped out the district of Alport Town, which had included 300 houses, and "Over 800 men were employed on the site. 25 million bricks, 50,000 tons of concrete, 12,000 tons of mild steel and 65 miles of rivets were used in its construction".

According to Historic England, the warehouse is a "unique survival of a three-way railway goods exchange station, serving the railway, canal and road networks of the Manchester region."

As of February 2023, the development includes an Odeon Cinema, casino, restaurants, bars, bowling alley, gym, and a multi-storey car park.

Future redevelopment
In December 2022, Trilogy Real Estate and Hong Kong-based Peterson Group brought forward updated plans for a mixed-use redevelopment of the site, featuring 746 homes across three buildings – including a 34-storey tower and a 27-storey tower. 

Trilogy's plans, designed by SimpsonHaugh Architects, seeks the partial demolition of a 1990s extension to the warehouse, which currently houses an Odeon cinema, an NCP car park, and a gym. 

The upper floors of the Great Northern Warehouse will be refurbished into offices. Trilogy has also been working with landscape architect Planit-IE on plans to revamp the square that fronts the warehouse.

See also

Grade II* listed buildings in Greater Manchester
Listed buildings in Manchester-M3

References

Grade II* listed buildings in Manchester
Warehouses in England
Tourist attractions in Manchester
Commercial buildings in Manchester
Grade II* listed commercial buildings
Commercial buildings completed in 1899
1899 establishments in England